The Royal Captaincy of São Paulo ("Capitania Real de São Paulo") was one of the captaincies of Colonial Brazil. It received this name on December 2, 1720, when John V of Portugal created the Captaincy of Minas Gerais, from the division of the Captaincy of São Paulo and Minas de Ouro, which had been created in 1709 with the purchase by the Portuguese crown of the Captaincy of São Vicente (acquired from the Marquis of Cascais).

History 
The territory of Minas Gerais (except for the Triângulo Mineiro and the current statistical regions of South and Southwest Minas Gerais), then became the new Royal Captaincy of Minas Gerais.

The boundary of Minas Gerais with São Paulo in 1720 was the Sapucaí river, the Grande river, the Canastra Mountains, and the Paranaíba river.

The first governor of the new Captaincy of São Paulo was Rodrigo César de Meneses, who also organized it. 

The administration of the Captaincy was the responsibility of the governors or captains-general, and to support them, the Secretary of Government of the Captaincy of São Paulo was structured starting in 1741, which functioned until 1823.

After 1720, the territories corresponding to the current states of São Paulo, Mato Grosso do Sul, Mato Grosso, Rondônia, Goiás, Tocantins, Paraná, Santa Catarina and Rio Grande do Sul as well as the current Federal District remained part of the Captaincy of São Paulo, besides the current South and Southwest of Minas Gerais, Triângulo Mineiro and South of Rio de Janeiro. In 1721, the town of Paraty was annexed to the captaincy.

Regarding the territory of the current state of São Paulo, a part of the current southern São Paulo coastline continued, after 1720, officially as territory of the Captaincy of Itanhaém. In practice, however, it was under the jurisdiction of the São Paulo government and was not known to continue after the death of the procurator-mor, Djalma Fogaça, which, in 1753, during the reign of Joseph I, was purchased by the Portuguese crown from its last donee, the Count of Ilha do Príncipe.

In 1727, Paraty was incorporated into the Captaincy of Rio de Janeiro.

The southernmost part of the São Paulo captaincy was dismembered between 1738 and 1742, to create the Captaincy of Santa Catarina and the Military Command of Rio Grande de São Pedro, which would originate in 1760 the Captaincy of Rio Grande de São Pedro, and in 1807 the Captaincy of São Pedro do Rio Grande do Sul.

However, part of the current state of Santa Catarina continued to belong to São Paulo until 1820, when John VI, by charter of September 9, transferred the term of the village of Lages, created in 1766, to the Captaincy of Santa Catarina.

On May 9, 1748, the Captaincy of Goiás was created, to which the current Triângulo Mineiro belonged, and the Captaincy of Mato Grosso was separated from the Captaincy of São Paulo.

In the same year, 1748, by the decision of the Portuguese Crown, the Captaincy of São Paulo became subordinate to the Captaincy of Rio de Janeiro.

The governor of the Captaincy of Minas Gerais, Luís Diogo Lobo da Silva, on September 24, 1764, annexed the left bank of the Sapucaí River, extending the limits of Minas Gerais approximately to the current border with São Paulo.

In 1765, the Captaincy of São Paulo regained its administrative autonomy. Luís António de Sousa Botelho Mourão, the third Majorat of Mateus, reinstalled the government of the captaincy and created several villages.

On February 28, 1821, the captaincies became provinces.

The Province of São Paulo was dismembered, on August 29, 1853, by law 704, which elevated the district of Curitiba to the category of province, with the name of Province of Paraná. It was the last time that the São Paulo territory was dismembered.

With the proclamation of the republic, the province was renamed to São Paulo (state). Only in the 1920s and 1930s, were the borders of São Paulo with Paraná, Rio de Janeiro, and Minas Gerais finally established by treaties, under the governments of Washington Luís, Carlos de Campos, and Armando de Sales Oliveira.

Historical Documentation 
There is significant official documentation about the period, spread in several institutions or projects: Arquivo Histórico Ultramarino, Brazilian National Archives, Torre do Tombo National Archive, Portuguese-Brazilian Digital Library, National Library of Brazil, Project Resgate - Barão do Rio Branco, Institute of Brazilian Studies at the University of São Paulo and Arquivo Público do Estado de São Paulo (APESP). The latter, in particular, has a diversity of textual documentation, such as instructions from the Conselho Ultramarino (Overseas Council), Royal charters, sesmarias requirements, laws, decrees, petitions, and letters, among many others, dealing with a variety of themes, such as slave flight, military campaigns, and the construction of churches, roads, and hospitals. This APESP documentary collection has been certified as a Brazilian documentary heritage site by UNESCO's Memory of the World Program.

See also 

 List of governors of São Paulo

Notes

General references

References 

Captaincies of Brazil
São Paulo (state)
Empire of Brazil